Edward Shane Lechler (born August 7, 1976) is an American former professional football player who played as punter for 18 seasons in the National Football League (NFL). He played college football at Texas A&M University and was drafted by the Oakland Raiders in the fifth round of the 2000 NFL Draft.

Regarded as one of the greatest punters in NFL history, Lechler was named an All-Pro nine times during his career, and made seven Pro Bowls. He led the league in punting average five times and is the NFL's all-time leader in career punting average. Lechler was one of two punters named to the NFL 100th Anniversary All-Time Team, along with Hall of Famer Ray Guy.

Early years
Lechler attended East Bernard High School in East Bernard, Texas, and was a standout in football, basketball, golf, and baseball. As quarterback, punter and placekicker, he led  East Bernard to the state quarterfinals his senior year, completing 87 of 101 (86.1%) passes for 1,640 yards and 11 touchdowns. In his high school career, he passed for nearly 5,000 yards and averaged 41.6 yards per punt. His longest punt in high school was 85 yards.

College career
Lechler attended Texas A&M University, and played for the Aggies football team from 1996 to 1999. A versatile player, he was not only the Aggies' punter but also kicked off, was the long field goal kicker, served as the holder for short field goals and PATs, and was the emergency quarterback. As a junior, he completed a 29-yard pass on a fake punt against Baylor and threw a touchdown pass to Dan Campbell on a fake field goal in a hard-fought 17–10 win against Texas Tech.

When injuries depleted the depth chart, Lechler served as the backup quarterback for the 1998 Big 12 championship game. At one point in the game, the Aggies' last healthy quarterback, Branndon Stewart, appeared shaken and a nervous-looking Lechler threw warmup passes on the sideline. Stewart was able to stay in the game, however, and led the Aggies to a 36–33 victory over Kansas State, earning the Aggies their only Big 12 Championship. Because of his contributions in so many facets of the game, coach R. C. Slocum called Lechler "the team's most valuable player."

Lechler started his career off strong at Texas A&M, earning Freshman All-America honors in 1996 with a punting average of 42.7 yards. After his sophomore season, he was named to the All-Big 12 team after breaking the Aggie single-season record with an average of 47.0 yards per punt. He was named to The Sporting News All-America team as a junior in 1998, and was also an Associated Press first team All-American honors as a senior in 1999, a year in which his 46.5 yards per punt is second in the record books only to his own sophomore record of 47.0. He is the NCAA record holder for career punt average with a mark of 44.7 yards per punt.

Lechler had only one punt blocked, against Ohio State in the 1999 Sugar Bowl.

Collegiate statistics

Professional career

Oakland Raiders

Lechler was drafted in the fifth round with the 142nd overall pick in the 2000 NFL Draft. He was the only punter selected that year.

2000 season: Rookie year

On September 3, 2000, in the season opener against the San Diego Chargers, Lechler made his NFL debut and had a season-high 10 punts for a season-high 424 net yards (42.4 average) as the Raiders won 9–6. During Week 10 against the Kansas City Chiefs, he converted all seven extra-point attempts in the game as the Raiders won by a score of 49–31. Two weeks later against the New Orleans Saints, Lechler had four punts for 219 net yards for a season-high 54.75 average as the Raiders won by a score of 31–22.

Lechler finished his rookie season with 65 punts for 2,984 net yards for a 45.91 average. The Raiders finished atop the AFC West with a 12–4 record and qualified for the playoffs. He was named to the NFL All-Rookie Team and earned First Team All-Pro honors. Lechler made his playoff debut in the Divisional Round against the Miami Dolphins. In the 27–0 victory, he had five punts for 234 net yards (46.8 average). In the AFC Championship against the Baltimore Ravens, he had seven punts for 315 net yards (45.00 average) in the 16–3 loss.

2001 season

During the season opener against the Kansas City Chiefs, Lechler had four punts for 185 net yards (46.25 average) in the 27–24 road victory. Two weeks later against the Miami Dolphins, he had a season-high seven punts for a season-high 345 net yards for a 49.29 average in the 18–15 road loss. Three weeks later against the Indianapolis Colts, Lechler had five punts for 262 net yards for a season-high 52.4 average in the 23–18 road victory. He earned his first Pro Bowl nomination.

Lechler finished his second professional season with 73 punts for 3,375 yards for a 46.23 average. The Raiders finished atop the AFC West for the second consecutive season with a 10–6 record and made the playoffs, but their season ended in a 16–13 road loss to the New England Patriots in the Divisional Round.

2002 season

Lechler's third professional season saw his team have a lot of success. During a Week 4 52–25 victory over the Tennessee Titans, he had three punts for 134 net yards for a 44.67 average in his season debut. In the next game against the Buffalo Bills, he had five punts for a season-high 250 net yards for a 50.00 average in the 49–31 road victory. On December 22, against the Denver Broncos, he had a season-high six punts for 244 net yards for a 40.67 average in the 28–16 victory. Overall, in the regular season, Lechler totaled 53 punts for 2,251 yards for a 42.47 average.

The Raiders finished atop the AFC West for the third consecutive year with an 11–5 record and made the playoffs. After two victories over the New York Jets in the Divisional Round and the Tennessee Titans in the AFC Championship, Lechler appeared in his first Super Bowl. In Super Bowl XXXVII, he had five punts for 195 net yards for a 39.00 average in the 48–21 loss to the Tampa Bay Buccaneers.

2003 season

During the season opener against the Tennessee Titans, Lechler had seven punts for 353 net yards for a 50.43 average in the 25–20 road loss. During a Week 5 24–21 road loss to the Chicago Bears, he had three punts for 166 net yards for a season-high 55.33 average. In the regular-season finale against the San Diego Chargers, he had a season-high nine punts for a season-high 424 net yards for a 47.11 average as the Raiders lost on the road by a score of 21–14. Lechler recorded a 73-yard punt, which was the longest by any punter in the NFL for the 2003 season.

Lechler finished the 2003 season with 96 punts for 4,503 yards for a 46.91 average as the Raiders finished the season with a 4–12 record. He was named as a First Team All-Pro for the second time.

2004 season

Lechler started his fifth professional season in the season-opening 24–21 road loss against the Pittsburgh Steelers, punting thrice for 132 net yards and a 44 average. During a Week 6 31–3 loss to the Denver Broncos, he had a season-high seven punts for a season-high 333 net yards for a 47.57 average. Three weeks later against the Carolina Panthers, Lechler punted thrice for 167 net yards for a season-high 55.67 average in the 27–24 road victory. He finished the season with 73 punts for 3,409 yards for a 46.7 average as the Raiders finished with a 5–11 record. He earned a second Pro Bowl nomination and was named as a First Team All-Pro for the third time.

2005 season

In the season-opening game against the New England Patriots, Lechler had eight punts for 356 net yards for a 44.5 average in the 30–20 road loss. On Christmas Eve, against the Denver Broncos, he had five punts for 295 net yards for a season-high 59.00 average. On New Year's Eve, against the New York Giants, he had a season-high nine punts for a season-high 421 net yards for a 46.78 average. Overall, in the 2005 season, he had 82 punts for 3,744 yards for a 45.66 average as the Raiders finished with a 4–12 record.

2006 season

On September 11, in a shutout loss to the San Diego Chargers in the season opener, he had nine punts for 420 net yards for a 46.67 average. On November 6, against the Seattle Seahawks, he had a season-high ten punts for a season-high 450 net yards for a 45.00 average. Overall, in the 2006 season, he totaled 77 punts for 3,660 net yards for a 47.53 average as the Raiders struggled to a 2–14 season.

2007 season

Lechler was part of the 2007 Oakland Raiders team that went 4–12 on the season. On October 21, against the Kansas City Chiefs, he had a season-high nine punts for a season-high 461 net yards for a 51.22 average. On November 11, against the Chicago Bears, he had nine punts for 433 net yards for a 48.11 average. Overall, he recorded 73 total punts for 3,585 net yards for a 49.11 average. He earned a Pro Bowl nomination for the third time.

2008 season

On September 8, in the season opener against the Denver Broncos, Lechler had five punts for 255 net yards for a 51.00 average. On November 9, against the Carolina Panthers, he had a season-high 11 punts for a season-high 556 net yards for a 50.55 average. On November 23, in the second divisional game against the Denver Broncos, he had three punts for 176 net yards for a season-high 58.67 average. Overall, in the 2008 season, he totaled 90 punts for 4,391 yards for a 48.79 average. He earned a fourth Pro Bowl nomination and was named as a First Team All-Pro for the fourth time.

2009 season

On February 18, 2009, he signed a four-year, $12 million contract, making him the highest-paid punter in NFL history.

On September 14, in the season opener against the San Diego Chargers, Lechler had four punts for 195 net yards for a 48.75 average as the Raiders lost by a score of 24–20. In the next game against the Kansas City Chiefs, he had seven punts for 398 net yards for a season-high 56.86 average in the 13–10 road victory. On November 15, in the second divisional game against the Chiefs, he had a season-high 11 punts for a season-high 531 net yards for a 48.27 average as the Raiders lost by a score of 16–10.

Lechler finished the 2009 season with 96 punts for 4,909 net yards for a 51.14 average. His 4,909 yards in the 2009 season marked the Raider record for most punting yards in a season. He earned a fifth career Pro Bowl nomination and was named as a First Team All-Pro for the fourth time. Lechler was named to the Pro Football Hall of Fame All-2000s Team.

2010 season

On September 12, in the season-opening road loss to the Tennessee Titans, he had four punts for 219 net yards for a season-high 54.75 average. On November 21, against the Pittsburgh Steelers, he had a season-high eight punts for a season-high 390 net yards for a 48.75 average. Overall, on the 2010 season, he had 77 total punts for 3,618 net yards for a 46.99 average. He earned a sixth career Pro Bowl nomination and was named as a First Team All-Pro for the fifth time.

2011 season

On September 12, in the season opener against the Denver Broncos, Lechler had six punts for 349 net yards for a season-high 58.17 average. In Week 6 of the 2011 season, as the holder for placekicker Sebastian Janikowski, he threw a 35-yard touchdown pass to tight end Kevin Boss on a fake field goal attempt. In Week 12, on November 27, he kicked a career-best 80-yard punt against the Chicago Bears. That punt, kicked from his own 10-yard line (the Oakland 20-yard line was the line of scrimmage), bounced at the Chicago 11 and went into the endzone after traveling 79 yards in the air, setting a franchise record for the longest punt by an Oakland Raider. On December 4, against the Miami Dolphins, he had a season-high eight punts for a season-high 372 net yards for a 46.5 average. Overall, in the 2011 season, he recorded 78 total punts for 3,960 yards for a 50.77 average. He earned a seventh Pro Bowl nomination.

2012 season

On September 10, against the San Diego Chargers, he had a quiet season opener with only two punts for 114 net yards for a season-high 57.00 average. In the next game, against the Miami Dolphins, his use increased with a season-high nine punts for a season-high 422 net yards for a 46.89 average. Lechler and the Raiders struggled to a 4–12 season in 2012 as he had 81 total punts for 3,826 net yards for a 47.23 average.

Houston Texans

2013 season

On March 23, 2013, Lechler signed with the Houston Texans. The contract was a three-year deal worth $5.5 million with a $1 million signing bonus.

On September 9, against the San Diego Chargers, he had three punts for 135 net yards for a 45.00 average in his Texans debut. During Week 10 on November 10, Lechler became just the sixth player in NFL history to reach the 50,000 punt-yard mark during his second punt of the game against the Arizona Cardinals. On November 17, against his former team, the Oakland Raiders, he had a season-high nine punts for 442 net yards for a 49.11 average. Overall, on the 2013 season, he recorded 88 punts for 4,189 yards for a 47.60 average.

2014 season

On September 7, in the season opener against the Washington Redskins, Lechler had six punts for 306 net yards for a 51.00 average. On October 9, against the Indianapolis Colts, he had four punts for 218 net yards for a season-high 54.5 average. During Week 15 on December 14, third-string quarterback Tom Savage was injured with under 2 minutes left and Houston down 7, needing a touchdown to tie the game. All of their other quarterbacks were injured, and Lechler, a former high school quarterback, began to warm up. Houston called a timeout after the injury and Savage stayed in the game, throwing an interception on the very next play. Lechler never entered the game. On December 21, against the Baltimore Ravens, he had a season-high eight punts for a season-high 361 net yards for a 45.13 average. Overall, on the 2014 season, he had 83 punts for 3,845 net yards for a 46.33 average.

2015 season

On September 13, against the Kansas City Chiefs, he had seven punts for 329 net yards for a 47.00 average. On November 22, against the New York Jets, he had eight punts for a season-high 417 net yards for a 52.13 average. Overall, on the 2015 season, he had 95 total punts for 4,497 net yards for a 47.34 average.

The Texans finished the 2015 season with a 9–7 record and qualified for the playoffs. In his first playoff game since the 2002 season, Lechler had five punts for 228 net yards (45.60 average) in the 30–0 loss to the Kansas City Chiefs in the Wild Card Round.

2016 season

On March 11, 2016, Lechler signed a one-year, $1.3 million contract with the Texans.

On September 11, in the season opener against the Chicago Bears, Lechler had five punts for 243 net yards for a 48.6 average. In Week 8, against the Detroit Lions, Lechler had four punts for 203 net yards for a 50.75 average to earn AFC Special Teams Player of the Week. In Week 16, against the Cincinnati Bengals, he had a season-high eight punts for a season-high 371 net yards for a 46.38 average. Overall, on the 2016 season, he had 72 total punts for 3,423 net yards for a 47.54 average.

The Texans finished the 2016 season with a 9–7 record and qualified for the playoffs. In the Wild Card Round victory over the Oakland Raiders, Lechler had nine punts for 414 net yards (46.00 average). In the Divisional Round against the New England Patriots, he had eight punts for 341 net yards (42.63 average) in the 34–16 loss.

2017 season

On March 8, 2017, Lechler signed a one-year contract extension with the Texans.

On September 10, in the season-opening loss to the Jacksonville Jaguars, Lechler had five punts for 216 net yards for a 43.2 average. On December 17, in the second divisional game against the Jacksonville Jaguars, he had a season-high 11 punts for a season-high 518 net yards for a 47.09 average. Overall, in the 2017 season, Lechler and the Texans finished with a 4–12 record. He finished with 92 total punts for 4,507 yards for a 48.99 average.

2018 season
On March 8, 2018, Lechler signed a one-year contract for $2 million to remain with the Texans.

On August 31, 2018, Lechler was released by the Texans after rookie Trevor Daniel won the starting job. Afterwards, he stated he did not plan on retiring.

Retirement
After sitting out of the league for the entire 2018 season, Lechler officially announced his retirement on March 30, 2019. He was named to the Pro Football Hall of Fame All-2010s Team and the NFL 100 All-Time Team.

Records
Lecher booted at least one punt of 50 yards or more in 33 consecutive games from Week 13 of 2003 through Week 14 of 2005, the longest streak by any player since the AFL/NFL merger in 1970. He was a seven-time Pro Bowler, in 2001, 2004 and 2007–2011, and was voted All-Pro nine times, in 2000, 2001, 2003, 2004, 2007–2011. He holds the NFL record for best average per punt in a career (47.3). He has the five best single-season punting averages in Raiders history, including a career-best 51.1 in 2009, the second-highest single-season average in league history (to Sammy Baugh's 51.4 in 1940).

NFL career statistics

Regular season

Postseason

Personal life
Lechler is married to Erin Gibson, who was an All-American volleyball player at Texas A&M. He comes from an athletic family: both of his parents participated in Baylor athletics, and his brother Derek was a punter for Texas A&M.

See also
List of most consecutive games played by National Football League players
List of National Football League annual punting yards leaders
List of National Football League career punting yards leaders

Notes

References

External links

 
 12th Man Magazine article

Living people
1976 births
American Conference Pro Bowl players
American football punters
Oakland Raiders players
Houston Texans players
People from Wharton County, Texas
Texas A&M Aggies football players